S-Curve Records is an American record label founded in 2000 by former Mercury Records executive Steve Greenberg.  It is based in New York City.  In 2001 the label established a distribution and licensing agreement with EMI Records. Among the hits released by S-Curve between 2000-2004 were "Who Let the Dogs Out?" by Baha Men, "Stacy's Mom" by Fountains of Wayne and Joss Stone's first two albums, the Soul Sessions and Mind Body & Soul. All of these artists received multiple Grammy nominations, with Baha Men winning the "Best Dance Recording" Grammy in 2001. 

In 2007 Greenberg relaunched the label after a two-year hiatus, during which he served as President of Columbia Records. In 2010, the label's distribution deal with EMI came to an end and S-Curve entered into a new U.S. distribution deal, with Universal Music Group. From 2012-2015, Warner Music Group distributed the label outside of North America.

The S-Curve roster and catalog include titles by Andy Grammer, Leslie Odom Jr., We the Kings, Bay Ledges, Daisy the Great, Netta Barzilai, Rachel Crow, Maxi Priest, Michael Blume, Hailey Knox, Duran Duran, Betty Wright, Fountains of Wayne, Baha Men, The Beu Sisters, Sarah Hudson, Tom Jones, Little Jackie, Diane Birch, Nikki Jean, David Broza,  Joshua Henry, Conkarah, Rozzi Crane, A Great Big World, Swamp Dogg, Night Bus, A-WA, Care Bears on Fire, Sinking Ships, Tinted Windows and Joss Stone.

S-Curve's 2011 release by Betty Wright and the Roots, Betty Wright: The Movie was nominated for a Grammy in the "Best Traditional R&B Performance" category. Andy Grammer's debut album has yielded the hit singles "Keep Your Head Up" (certified Platinum in the U.S.) "Miss Me" and "Fine By Me" (certified Gold). His follow-up album, Magazines or Novels, contained the triple-platinum selling single "Honey, I'm Good" and the gold-certified "Good to Be Alive (Hallelujah)". Grammar's 2016 release "Fresh Eyes" has been certified Platinum in the US, Canada, and Australia.  In July 2012, S-Curve released Joss Stone's the Soul Sessions Vol. II, a sequel to her 2003 debut album, produced by Greenberg, who also produced Stone's first two albums during the label's initial incarnation. That album achieved Top 10 statues on both the Billboard 200 album chart and the UK Albums Chart. AJR has earned five platinum singles on the S-Curve label, they are no longer on the label. Maxi Priest was nominated for a 2021 Grammy in the "Best Reggae Album" category for his S-Curve release "It All Comes Back To Love."

Besides releasing music, S-Curve's business interests include music publishing and the company's equity stakes in online media companies Vydia, Eko (formerly Interlude), YouNow, Stationhead, Selectable Media (formerly Nabbr), Hyperactivate (creators of Hashtag Art) and Soomla. In 2011 and 2012, music videos released by S-Curve using Eko's interactive video technology won MTV "O Music Awards" for "Most Innovative Video": Grammer's "Keep Your Head Up" and We the Kings's "Say You Like Me."

The record label and publishing company were acquired by BMG Rights Management in November 2015, with Greenberg continuing at the helm. S-Curve continues to independently own stakes in its portfolio of tech companies.

In 2021, the label relaunched in a partnership with Disney Music Group. However, the back catalog remains with BMG.

See also
 List of record labels

References

 American record labels
 Record labels established in 2000
Pop record labels
 Disney Music Group
 Labels distributed by Universal Music Group
 New York (state) record labels